Variety is a 1935 British musical film directed by Adrian Brunel and starring George Carney, Barry Livesey and Sam Livesey. The film follows a revue show format, with a number of performers playing themselves. It was made at Cricklewood Studios.

Cast
 George Carney   
 Barry Livesey as Victor Boyd 
 Cassie Livesey as Maggie Boyd 
 Jack Livesey as Matt Boyd 
 Sam Livesey as Charlie Boyd 
 April Vivian as Joan 
 Phyllis Robins   
 The Sherman Fisher Girls as Themselves
 Billy Cotton as himself
 Lily Morris as herself
 Horace Sheldon as himself
 Bertha Willmott as herself

Bibliography
 Low, Rachael. History of the British Film: Filmmaking in 1930s Britain. George Allen & Unwin, 1985 .

External links

1935 films
1935 musical films
British musical films
Films shot at Cricklewood Studios
Films directed by Adrian Brunel
British black-and-white films
1930s English-language films
1930s British films